Paul Graham (born November 28, 1967) is an American former professional basketball player. He played four years of college basketball for Ohio where he averaged 19.7 points, 5.5 rebounds and 2.6 assists per game in 110 career games.

Coming out of college, Graham moved to Australia in 1990 where he joined the Goldfields Giants of the Western Australian State League. He played in 10 games for the Giants before departing the club mid-season to return to the United States for an NBA tryout. In his final game for the Giants, he scored a league record equalling 82 points in a 155–134 win over the Willetton Tigers. Over his 10-game stint, he averaged 43.3 points, 5.9 rebounds, 3.7 assists, 2.7 steals and 1.7 blocks per game.

Upon his return to the United States, Graham joined the Albany Patroons of the Continental Basketball Association for the 1990–91 season. Following this stint, he had a three-year run with the NBA's Atlanta Hawks between 1991 and 1994. In 179 games for the Hawks, he averaged 8.4 points, 2.4 rebounds, 2.0 assists and 1.0 steals in 18.7 minutes per game.

Between 1994 and 1997, Graham played in Continental Basketball Association. He then embarked on an overseas career in 1997, playing in Puerto Rico and France before returning to the United States in mid-1998. Graham later had stints in Israel, France, Dominican Republic and Latvia before wrapping up his career with minor stints in the United States Basketball League and the Eastern Basketball Alliance.

References

External links

NBA.com profile 

1967 births
Living people
Albany Patroons players
American expatriate basketball people in Australia
American expatriate basketball people in France
American expatriate basketball people in Israel
American expatriate basketball people in Latvia
American men's basketball players
Atlanta Hawks players
Atlantic City Seagulls players
Basketball players from Philadelphia
JDA Dijon Basket players
Ohio Bobcats men's basketball players
Omaha Racers players
Rapid City Thrillers players
Shooting guards
SIG Basket players
Small forwards
Undrafted National Basketball Association players
United States Basketball League players
American expatriate basketball people in the Philippines
Philippine Basketball Association imports
Pop Cola Panthers players